The 2007–08 Azerbaijan Premier League is the 16th season of Azerbaijan Premier League, the Azerbaijani professional league for association football clubs, since its establishment in 1992. Khazar Lankaran were the defending champions, having won the previous season.

Teams
Shahdag Qusar were relegated after finishing the previous season in 13th.  FK Gäncä, who were excluded from the league the previous season, also wouldn't take part in the 2007-08 season. On 13 August 2007 UEFA declared MKT Araz defunct and withdrew their participation from the league.

They were replaced by ABN Bärdä, Masallı and Standard Baku from the Azerbaijan First Division.

Stadia and locations

1Karabakh played their home matches at Surakhani Stadium in Baku before moving to their current stadium on 3 May 2009.

Personnel and kits

Note: Flags indicate national team as has been defined under FIFA eligibility rules. Players may hold more than one non-FIFA nationality.

Managerial changes

League table

Results

Season statistics

Top scorers

Hat-tricks

 4 Player scored 4 goals

References

Azerbaijan - List of final tables (RSSSF)

Azerbaijan Premier League seasons
Azer
1